Vahine no te vi (English: Woman with a Mango) is an 1892 painting by Paul Gauguin, currently in the collection of the Baltimore Museum of Art. It is one of the earliest of about seventy paintings he produced during his first visit to Tahiti and is one of many works of modern art in the museum's Cone Collection.

The painting depicts Teha'amana or Tehura, Gauguin's 13-year-old "wife" and mother of his child. Gauguin returned to Paris before the birth and by the time he returned Tehura had remarried a local man, with whom she brought up the child. The work was subsequently acquired by Degas.

References

Paintings by Paul Gauguin
1892 paintings
Paintings in the collection of the Baltimore Museum of Art
Women in French Polynesia
Paintings of children